Stadion Aldo Drosina is a multi-use stadium in Pula, Croatia.  It is currently used mostly for football matches and is the home ground of NK Istra 1961 and formerly NK Istra.  The stadium has a capacity of 9,800. From March 2009 to January 2011 the stadium has undergone a major reconstruction. The west stand was completely demolished and redesigned, a roof over the west stand was added. New seats replaced bench seating all around the stadium, and the three existing stands were cleaned up.  On 9 February 2011, Croatia hosted the Czech Republic in an international football friendly for the inaugural match to open the stadium. The match finished with a 4–2 win for Croatia.

The stadium is named after Aldo Drosina (1932–2000), a noted football player and coach from Pula.

International matches

References

Aldo Drosina
NK Istra 1961
Buildings and structures in Pula
Sport in Pula